Desmond Robinson (30 December 1927 – 10 December 2015) was a British cyclist. He competed in the individual and team road race events at the 1952 Summer Olympics. He was the brother of fellow racing cyclist Brian Robinson.

Robinson started racing seriously in 1945, when he joined Huddersfield Road Club. As well as competing at the Olympics, his career highlights included winning the Manx International in 1949 and the amateur version of the Tour of Britain in 1955. He retired from competition at the end of 1955.

Outside of cycling, Robinson earned a Higher National Certificate in Mechanical and Electrical Engineering, and worked for his father's joinery firm, HF Robinson and Sons, later joining Imperial Chemical Industries in Redcar. He subsequently lectured in engineering at Wakefield College and Barnsley College.

Robinson married Beryl in 1953: the couple had three daughters, Linda, Denise and Jane. He died in December 2015, after suffering a stroke in May of that year, and was survived by his wife, children and five grandchildren.

References

External links
 

1927 births
2015 deaths
British male cyclists
Olympic cyclists of Great Britain
Cyclists at the 1952 Summer Olympics
Sportspeople from Dewsbury
English engineers
20th-century English educators